Charles Fraser (5 May 1868 – 10 December 1916) was a Scotland international rugby union player.

Rugby Union career

Amateur career

He went to Glasgow University.

Fraser then played rugby union for Glasgow University. He captained the side.

He occasionally played for West of Scotland.

Provincial career

He played for Glasgow District in their inter-city match against Edinburgh District on 6 December 1885.

He played for West of Scotland District in their match against East of Scotland District on 30 January 1886.

International career

Fraser was capped 2 times by Scotland in the period 1888 to 1889.

Administrative career

He was one of Glasgow District's representatives on the Scottish Rugby Union board.

Refereeing career

He refereed Scottish Unofficial Championship matches.

Other sports

He played cricket for Glasgow Academy, as well as Glasgow University.

He was a noted sprinter.

Military career

He joined the 1st Lanarkshire Rifle Volunteers in 1897 as a 2nd Lieutanent.

Law career

He became a solicitor.

Family

He was the son of the Rev. Fraser of Paisley.

His brother M. P. Fraser was a well known Edinburgh advocate.

He married Janet Anderson.

Death

His death was announced in the Daily Record newspaper of 12 December 1916 as 'suddenly, after an operation'.

He left an estate of £1434, 8 shillings and 6 pence.

References

1868 births
1916 deaths
Glasgow District (rugby union) players
Glasgow University RFC players
Rugby union players from Paisley, Renfrewshire
Scotland international rugby union players
Scottish rugby union players
Scottish rugby union referees
Scottish Unofficial Championship referees
West of Scotland District (rugby union) players
West of Scotland FC players